Nallavanukku Nallavan is a 1984 Indian Tamil-language action drama film, directed by S. P. Muthuraman and produced by AVM Productions. A remake of the 1983 Telugu film Dharmaatmudu, it stars Rajinikanth and Raadhika, with Karthik, Thulasi, V. K. Ramasamy, Major Sundarrajan, Y. G. Mahendran and Visu in supporting roles. The film revolves around a worker who is bequeathed his late boss's business, earning the wrath of the boss's son who believes he swindled his father's business.

The screenplay of Nallavanukku Nallavan was written by Visu, who made minor changes to differentiate it from the Telugu original, which co-producer M. Saravanan noticed was very similar to the unsuccessful Tamil film Hitler Umanath (1982). The music of the film was composed by Ilaiyaraaja, cinematography was handled by Babu, and editing by R. Vittal.

Nallavanukku Nallavan was released on 22 October 1984, Diwali day and became a major commercial success, running for over 150 days in theatres. For his performance, Rajinikanth won numerous awards, including the Filmfare Award for Best Actor – Tamil.

Plot 
Manickam is a well-meaning rogue. Uma, an orphaned woman, enters his house for safety from criminals who were chasing her. After he saves her from other criminals, he learns that she is a missing woman and drops her at her house. But upon seeing the abusive nature of her uncle Sadhasivam, he saves her and they marry. Manickam promises Uma he will not engage in violence, and surrenders to police inspector Azhagarsamy for his earlier acts.

Manickam is released from prison in time to see his newborn daughter Priya. Gangadharan, a friend of Azhagarsamy, gives Manickam employment at his factory, Victory Industries. When Gangadharan becomes bankrupt, he plans to close Victory Industries as he is unable to repay his debts to money lenders. Manickam persuades him to give him a chance to revive it and with hard efforts he repays all debts. As a token of gratitude, Gangadharan gives all his wealth to Manickam before dying.

Several years later, Manickam has been running Victory Industries to everyone's satisfaction. He also controls the financial affairs of Gangadharan's family. But Gangadharan's spoilt son Vinod dislikes Manickam, believing he swindled his father's business. Vinod tries to avenge Manickam by luring Priya. He brainwashes and marries her, much to the agony of Manickam and Uma, and Priya becomes estranged from them. Uma later dies of cardiac arrest. Manickam donates all his wealth and properties to Vinod, and tells him that he did not swindle his father's business.

Sadhasivam later tries to kill Vinod so that he can usurp his wealth. Priya informs Manickam of this, so he arrives and defeats Sadhasivam's thugs, saving Vinod in the process, while his friend Thakkali ties up Sadhasivam to be taken by the police. Manickam makes amends with Vinod and Priya, and plans to return to his old house, but is dissuaded by Priya, who reveals she is pregnant with Vinod's child.

Cast 
Rajinikanth as Manickam
Raadhika as Uma
Karthik as Vinod
Thulasi as Priya
V. K. Ramasamy as Sadhasivam
Major Sundarrajan as Azhagarsamy
Y. G. Mahendran as Thakkali
Visu as Gangadharan
Kalpana Iyer (special appearance in the song "Vechukkava")

Production

Development 
After watching the Telugu film Dharmaatmudu (1983), director A. C. Tirulokchandar told M. Saravanan of AVM Productions about his desire to remake it in Tamil; he wanted Rajinikanth to play the male lead. Producer K. Balaji had earlier attempted a remake with Sivaji Ganesan, but dropped the project after feeling it was not suitable for Ganesan. Saravanan and others saw Dharmaatmudu, and noticed how similar it was to the Tamil film Hitler Umanath (1982). Screenwriter Panchu Arunachalam objected to remaking Dharmaatmudu since Hitler Umanath was unsuccessful, but Saravanan and director S. P. Muthuraman knew there was something responsible for Dharmaatmudus success. They called Visu who, after watching the film, said it could be remade well with minor changes. He was soon finalised as the screenwriter for the remake which was titled Nallavanukku Nallavan. The film was directed by Muthuraman, produced by Saravanan and his brother M. Balasubramanian, with M. S. Guhan receiving an "associate producer" credit. Babu was hired for cinematography, and R. Vittal for editing.

Casting and filming 
Rajinikanth was cast Manickam and Raadhika as Uma. Raadhika was cast after the producers were impressed with her performance in the Telugu film Bava Maradallu (1984). Muthuraman believed it would be innovative to see a heroic actor play a negative character, so he approached Karthik for the role of Vinod. He initially refused as he was not interested in portraying a negative character, but after Saravanan promised to cast him in a heroic role in a later film (which would become 1985's Nalla Thambi), he agreed. Visu, in addition to working as screenwriter, also appeared as Vinod's father Gangadharan.

The song "Vechukkava" was shot on a set resembling a five-star hotel with 200 television sets used. The song "Unnaithane" was intended to be shot at Kerala, but could not due to heavy rain there. Instead, it was shot at Muttukaadu due to its atmosphere resembling that of Kerala. One scene in the film involving a strike was based on a real incident which happened at TVS Motor Company. For another scene, picturised on Rajinikanth and Karthik and shot at AVM Studios, Babu lied on a bed-sheet spread over the floor to film it from a new angle.

The climax was initially very sentimental and, according to Saravanan, a poetic finish. While watching the double positive, he was dissatisfied since Nallavanukku Nallavan was primarily an action film and felt a gentle climax would not be suitable. Both Rajinikanth and Muthuraman preferred the sentimental climax, but Saravanan remained adamant. The film was already cleared by the Censor Board with the sentimental climax, but it was decided to reshoot the film with an action-packed climax and submit that too to the Board, then decide which one to keep based on audience reactions; the audience preferred the action-packed climax.

Themes 
S. Rajanayagam, author of Popular Cinema and Politics in South India: The Films of MGR and Rajinikanth, notes that Rajinikanth tries through his films to convey the message that he becomes a Tamilian by marital alliance, citing Nallavanukku Nallavan as an example. S. P. Muthuraman has stated that the film shows two polarising personalities of Manickam: the first half of the film has "commercial" elements and shows him as a dada; the second half shows him as a "rich man". Rajanayagam and film critic Naman Ramachandran note that the scene where Gangadharan asks Manickam if he has heard about a bus conductor who became a superstar through hard work, is a reference to Rajinikanth's early life as a bus conductor before he became an actor.

Soundtrack 
The soundtrack was composed by Ilaiyaraaja, with Na. Kamarasan, Vairamuthu, Gangai Amaran, Muthulingam and Vaali working as lyricists. The song "Unnaithane", written by Vairamuthu, was originally intended for a film to be directed by V. C. Guhanathan, but could not be used there. After obtaining a No Objection Certificate from Guhanathan, Saravanan was able to use the song in Nallavanukku Nallavan. It is set in Shivaranjani, a Carnatic raga, and marked playback singer Manjula Gururaj's debut in Tamil cinema. "Vechukkava" is set in the raga Sankarabharanam. It was remixed by Yuvan Shankar Raja in Silambattam (2008).

Release and reception 

Nallavanukku Nallavan was released on 22 October 1984, Diwali day. On 26 October 1984, The Hindu in its review wrote, "Muthuraman has a large hand in embellishing the dramatic elements with deft touches and polished handling". Despite facing competition from other Diwali releases such as Vaidehi Kathirunthal and the Tamil-dubbed version of the Malayalam-language My Dear Kuttichathan, the film was a major commercial success, running for over 150 days in theatres. According to a 2014 estimate by Sunita Raghu of The New Indian Express, it grossed .

Accolades

Notes

References

Bibliography

External links 

1980s action drama films
1980s Tamil-language films
1984 drama films
1984 films
AVM Productions films
Films directed by S. P. Muthuraman
Films scored by Ilaiyaraaja
Films with screenplays by Visu
Indian action drama films
Tamil remakes of Telugu films